Crawford Dunlop Falconer (born 1954) is the United Kingdom's Chief Trade Negotiation Adviser and is based in the Department for International Trade (DIT), which employs about 200 trade negotiators. He was recruited to the Civil Service in 2017 during the run-up to Brexit. As well as leading trade negotiation, he is the Second Permanent Secretary for the DIT.

Falconer has served in variety of roles including the New Zealand Ambassador and Permanent Representative to the World Trade Organisation (WTO), and as New Zealand's Chief Negotiator and Adviser. Previous to his job in the Brexit trade negotiations he was Special Trade Commissioner for the Legatum Institute, a private think tank.

In 2019 it was reported that despite the support of Conservatives in favour of Brexit, he had had little access to Prime Minister Theresa May.

Three years later, as the Australia–United Kingdom Free Trade Agreement was about to come into force, George Eustice, who had been part of the negotiating team as Secretary of State for Environment, Food and Rural Affairs, faulted the deal as "not actually a very good deal for the UK" in a speech to the House of Commons and blamed Falconer, calling him "not fit for that position, in my experience". Eustice said Falconer "always [internalised] Australian demands, often when they were against UK interests, his advice was invariably to retreat and make fresh concessions and all the while he resented people who understood technical issues greater than he did." He suggested Falconer be replaced.

Personal life 
In 1978 he married his wife and they have two daughters; Beatrice Falconer (b.1983) and Leonora Falconer (b. 1985).

References

Living people
1954 births
People from Greenock
Scottish emigrants to New Zealand
New Zealand economists
New Zealand public servants
Alumni of the London School of Economics
Victoria University of Wellington alumni
Academic staff of the Lincoln University (New Zealand)